Bertie Marshall (5 May 1902 – 5 February 1991) was an English cricketer active from 1923 to 1929, making four appearances in first-class cricket for Nottinghamshire. Born at Sutton-in-Ashfield, Nottinghamshire, Marshall was a right-handed batsman and right-arm fast bowler.

Marshall made his first-class debut for Nottinghamshire against Derbyshire at Trent Bridge in the 1923 County Championship. He made two further appearances in the 1924 County Championship against Worcestershire and Glamorgan, before playing his fourth match some five years later in the 1929 County Championship against Middlesex. He scored a total of 61 runs in his four matches, top-scoring with 36. With the ball he took 5 wickets at an expensive average of 40.60, with best figures of 2/39. Ten years later he played four matches for Staffordshire in the 1939 Minor Counties Championship.

He died at Durham, County Durham on 5 February 1991.

Notes

External links
Bertie Marshall at ESPNcricinfo
Bertie Marshall at CricketArchive

1902 births
1991 deaths
Cricketers from Sutton-in-Ashfield
English cricketers
Nottinghamshire cricketers
Staffordshire cricketers